Kenneth Calvert may refer to:
 Ken Calvert, U.S. Representative from California
 Kenneth E. Calvert, member of the Virginia House of Delegates
 Kenneth Leonard Calvert, American electrical engineer